The 1983 Men's Hockey Champions Trophy was the fifth edition of the Hockey Champions Trophy men's field hockey tournament. It took place from 28 October - 4 November in Karachi, Pakistan.

Tournament

Final table

Results

Winning Squad

References

C
C
1983
Champions Trophy (field hockey)